The Journal of Legal Medicine is a quarterly peer-reviewed academic journal covering legal medicine and medical law. It was established in 1979 and is published by Taylor & Francis on behalf of the American College of Legal Medicine, of which it is the official journal. The editor-in-chief is Leslie E. Wolf. According to the Journal Citation Reports, the journal has a 2019 impact factor of 0.417.

References

External links

Taylor & Francis academic journals
Medical law journals
Publications established in 1979
Quarterly journals
English-language journals
Academic journals associated with learned and professional societies of the United States